Pidikittapulli is a 1986 Indian Malayalam-language film, directed by K. S. Gopalakrishnan. The film stars Prameela, Ratheesh, Babysree and Balan K. Nair. The film's score was composed by K. J. Joy.

Cast
Prameela
Ratheesh
Babysree
Balan K. Nair
Bheeman Raghu

Soundtrack
The music was composed by K. J. Joy with lyrics by Bharanikkavu Sivakumar.

References

External links
 

1986 films
1980s Malayalam-language films